Qar was a doctor during the Sixth Dynasty of Egypt, which lasted from about 2350 to 2180 BC. He was the royal physician.

Adil Hussein discovered his tomb north of the pyramid of Sekhemkhet in 2001.  Qar died at the age of fifty years and his mummified remains were discovered by archaeologists in December 2006 in his mastaba at Saqqara, Egypt. As with many other tombs in Saqqara, his tomb was re-used several times.

Beside his mummy in the limestone sarcophagus, there were metal (bronze or copper) model tools that were entombed alongside his remains. In press reports following the discovery of the tomb and in several publications, they are regarded as surgical instruments. It was stated that they might be the oldest surgical tools in the world. However, these types of model tools are common in many Old Kingdom burials of officials with different functions. They are not surgical instruments. They are model tools. They, his mummy and the rest of the findings are in the Imhotep Museum at Saqqara.

Also 22 bronze statues were unearthed representing different deities in various shapes and sizes including Ptah, Horus-the-child (also known as Harpocrates) and Isis. A statuette of Imhotep the physician, the great engineer and builder of Djoser's pyramid complex, was also among the statuettes found by the team.

References

Court physicians
Ancient Egyptian physicians
Ancient Egyptian medicine
Ancient Egyptian mummies
People of the Sixth Dynasty of Egypt